Dilith Susantha Jayaweera (born 18 September 1967) is a Sri Lankan Businessman, Entrepreneur, Media mogul, and Lawyer. In 2011, he was named by the LMD as one of the ten ‘Business People of the Year’. In 2020, Dilith Jayaweera was among 100 corporate leaders named by the LMD on its A-list of businesspeople who continue to drive the engine of growth in Sri Lanka. He is the Chairman of George Steuart & Co., Sri Lanka's oldest mercantile establishment and Derana, one of Sri Lanka's largest media networks.

Education
Jayaweera received his primary and secondary education at St. Aloysius' College, Galle, and later joined the Faculty of Law at the University of Colombo, and subsequently Sri Lanka Law College, where he qualified as an Attorney-At-Law.

Career 
A lawyer by profession, Dilith Jayaweera set up Triad Advertising (Pvt) Limited in 1993, in partnership with Varuni Amunugama, whom he had met at the Faculty of Law, University of Colombo. Triad is the most awarded indigenous advertising agency in Sri Lanka.

Jayaweera's agency is known to have been behind several high-profile campaigns including ‘Api Wenuwen Api’  created on behalf of the Sri Lanka forces to raise the profile of the army, navy and air force during the latter stages of the Sri Lankan civil war against the LTTE.

The company has been heavily diversified and Jayaweera has set up over 20 subsidiaries. His media investments includes two national television channels Derana Macro Entertainment (Television), one national radio channel Derana Macro Entertainment (Radio) and three national newspapers Liberty Publishers. With the aim of building a modern conglomerate, Jayaweera entered industries such as travel and leisure, pharmaceuticals, property and manufacturing where he has established a strong presence through the George Steuart Group of companies.

Post-war investments 
In the post-war Sri Lankan economy, Jayaweera has risen to prominence as an aggressive investor – his investment arm Divasa Equity is a majority shareholder in public listed companies such as Citrus Leisure PLC and Colombo Land and Development PLC, and in October 2011 took over the 176-year-old George Steuart Group, Sri Lanka's oldest mercantile establishment and a successful diversified conglomerate. 
He sits on the Boards of several companies including Citrus Leisure PLC, Colombo Land PLC, and Triad (Pvt) Ltd, and is Chairman of the George Steuart Group of Companies.

Controversy 
The District Judge of Colombo in 2011 issued an enjoining order against Telshan Network of Opposition Leader Ranil Wickremesinghe’s brother Shan Wickremesinghe and one of his directors preventing them from defaming Dilith Jayaweera on a local radio channel Isira Radio. Order was given consequent to action filed by Dilith Jayaweera against Shan Wickremesinghe and his co-host for defamatory comments made on a radio show. Jayaweera also sent the BBC Sinhala service a letter of demand for defamation for carrying a story on the subject.

Personal life 
Dilith Jayaweera is married to Nelum, his contemporary at the University of Colombo. Dilith – along with his three brothers, Lalith, Gayan and Upul grew up in Galle, on the southern coast of Sri Lanka. His Father was an Additional Registrar of Lands and the Mother was a School Principal.
 
Dilith Jayaweera has been linked to Dinesh Palipana, Queensland's first quadriplegic intern. Palipana has credited Jayaweera with helping him progress through the accident that left him a quadriplegic.

References

External links 
 Official Website of Triad
 Official Website of Colombo Land and Development Company PLC
 Official Website of the George Steuart Group
 Official Website of Citrus Leisure PLC

Sri Lankan businesspeople
Sinhalese businesspeople
Sinhalese lawyers
Living people
People from Galle
1967 births
Alumni of the University of Colombo
Alumni of St. Aloysius' College, Galle
Mass media owners
Mass media company founders
21st-century businesspeople